Dash Tappeh (also Romanized as Dāsh Tappeh; also known as Tūsh Tepe) is a village in Bizineh Rud Rural District, Bizineh Rud District, Khodabandeh County, Zanjan Province, Iran. At the 2006 census, its population was 120, in 27 families.

References 

Populated places in Khodabandeh County